WFS may stand for:
Wave field synthesis
Web Feature Service, a standard protocol for serving georeferenced map data over the Internet
Well-founded semantics
Wells Fargo Securities
William French Smith
Wilmington Friends School
Windows Fax and Scan
Women for Sobriety
World Flute Society
World Food Summit
World Fuel Services
World Future Society